Desmia filicornis is a moth in the family Crambidae. It was described by Eugene G. Munroe in 1959. It is found in Panama.

References

Moths described in 1959
Desmia
Moths of Central America